Antonsen is a surname. It derived from the Antonius root name. Notable people with the surname include:

Ane Grethe Antonsen (1855–1930), Danish actress
Anders Antonsen (born 1997), Danish badminton player
Atle Antonsen (born 1969), Norwegian entertainer
Ivar Antonsen (born 1946), Norwegian musician
Jens Petter Antonsen (born 1963), Norwegian musician
Kasper Antonsen (born 1994), Danish badminton player
Kent-Are Antonsen (born 1995), Norwegian footballer
Linda Antonsen, Norwegian athlete
Ole Edvard Antonsen (born 1962), Norwegian musician
Thomas Marbory Antonsen, American engineer

See also

Antonson
Team Antonsen

References

Patronymic surnames
Danish-language surnames
Norwegian-language surnames
Surnames from given names